Evelyn Francis McHale (September 20, 1923 – May 1, 1947) was an American bookkeeper who died by suicide by jumping from the 86th-floor observation deck of the Empire State Building. A photograph taken four minutes after her death by photography student Robert Wiles subsequently gained iconic status, being referred to as "the most beautiful suicide".

Early life and education
Evelyn McHale was born in Berkeley, California, one of nine children born to Helen and Vincent McHale. Her father was a bank examiner who relocated to Washington, D.C., in 1930. Her mother suffered from undiagnosed and untreated depression. This led to a challenging marriage and ultimately a divorce. Vincent gained custody of all children and moved to Tuckahoe, New York.

Career
After graduating from high school, McHale joined the Women's Army Corps and was stationed in Jefferson City, Missouri. She later moved to Baldwin, New York, and was employed as a bookkeeper at the Kitab Engraving Company on Pearl Street. She met her fiance Barry Rhodes, a college student discharged from the United States Army Air Force.

Death
On April 30, 1947, McHale took a train from New York to Easton, Pennsylvania, to visit Rhodes. The next day, after leaving Rhodes's residence, she returned to New York City and went to the Empire State Building where she jumped from the 86th-floor observatory, landing on top of a parked car.

Rhodes did not notice any indication of suicidal thoughts before McHale left. Detective Frank Murray found her suicide note in a black pocketbook next to her neatly folded cloth coat over the observation deck wall. The note read:

Her body was identified by her sister, Helen Brenner. In accordance with her wishes, McHale was cremated with no memorial, service, or grave.

Barry Rhodes became an engineer before moving south. He died unmarried in Melbourne, Florida, on October 9, 2007.

Legacy

The photo of her body, taken by Robert Wiles, was published in Life magazine. It has been compared to the photograph by Malcolm Browne of the self-immolation of Vietnamese Buddhist monk Thích Quảng Đức, who burned himself alive at a busy Saigon road intersection in 1963; both are widely regarded as being among the most iconic suicide photographs. Ben Cosgrove of Time praised the photo as "technically rich, visually compelling and ... downright beautiful", describing her body as "resting, or napping, rather than ... dead" and appearing as if she is "daydreaming of her beau".

In popular culture
Andy Warhol used Wiles' photo in one of his prints entitled Suicide (Fallen Body). 

Her picture was also used on the cover of Saccharine Trust's album Surviving You, Always, released in 1984 by SST Records.

David Bowie's 1993 video for the single "Jump They Say" and Radiohead's 1995 music video for the single "Street Spirit (Fade Out)" both include a recreation of the image, with Bowie and Thom Yorke respectively splayed atop a smashed car. 

The cover of the 1995 album Gilt by the Tucson band Machines of Loving Grace uses a color photo that recreates the original image, while that of the 2009 Pearl Jam album Backspacer features an artist rendition of the iconic photograph in the bottom right corner.

On the cover of the 2019 album Better Out Than In by the St. Paul, MN band Skittish, singer and songwriter Jeff Noller poses in a stylized recreation of the infamous picture. 

The photograph is referenced in the movie Stranger Than Fiction by the character Karen Eiffel. The photograph is also referenced in the song "Shatter Me with Hope" by HIM from their album Screamworks: Love in Theory and Practice, with the lyrics "Turn to page 43, and you'll know how I feel," being in direct reference to the photograph as shown in LIFE Magazine's May 12, 1947 issue.

Parenthetical Girls' 2013 release Privilege (Abridged) opens with the track "Evelyn McHale". Reference was also made to the shot at the start of Taylor Swift's "Bad Blood" music video, released in 2015.

In the Cyberpunk: Edgerunners videoclip "Let you down", the main character, Sasha, kills herself jumping through a window and lands on a car. In the final scene, Maine watches Sasha's dead body and she looks very similar to Evelyn McHale.

References

People notable for being the subject of a specific photograph
Suicides by jumping in New York City
People from Tuckahoe, Westchester County, New York
1923 births
1947 suicides
People from Baldwin, Nassau County, New York
Black-and-white photographs
Women's Army Corps soldiers